Jay Anthony Lukas (April 25, 1933 – June 5, 1997) was an American journalist and author, probably best known for his 1985 book Common Ground: A Turbulent Decade in the Lives of Three American Families. Common Ground is a classic study of race relations, class conflict, and school busing in Boston, Massachusetts, as seen through the eyes of three families: one upper-middle-class white, one working-class white, and one working-class African-American.

Early years 
J. Anthony Lukas was born to Elizabeth and Edwin Lukas in White Plains, New York, followed by a younger brother in 1935, Christopher Lukas. His mother was an actress, and his uncle Paul Lukas was an Academy Award–winning actor. Lukas at first wanted to be an actor. After his mother committed suicide and his father's illness after her death, he was at the age of eight enrolled in the coeducational Putney School in Vermont.

He attended Harvard University, where he worked at the Harvard Crimson and graduated magna cum laude in 1955. He continued his education at the Free University of Berlin as an Adenauer Fellow. Thereafter, he served in the United States Army in Japan, where he wrote commentaries for VUNC (the Voice of the United Nations Command).

Career
Lukas began his professional journalism career at The Baltimore Sun, then moved to The New York Times. He stayed at the Times for nine years, working as a roving reporter, and serving at the Washington, D.C., New York City, and United Nations bureaus, and overseas in Ceylon, India, Japan, Pakistan, South Africa and Zaire. After working at the New York Times Magazine as a staff writer and freelancer for a short time in the 1970s (where he notably covered the Watergate scandal in two issue-length articles that served as the basis for a 1976 book, Nightmare: The Underside of the Nixon Years), Lukas quit reporting to pursue a career in book and magazine writing, becoming known for writing intensely researched nonfiction works. He was a contributor to The Atlantic Monthly, the Columbia Journalism Review, Esquire, Harper's Magazine, The Nation, The New Republic, and the Saturday Review. Additionally, he was the co-founder and editor of MORE, a "critical journal" on the news media which "collapsed" in 1978, and a "contributing editor to the New Times, an alternative magazine that folded also in 1978."

Death
Lukas had been diagnosed with depression in the late 1980s. In an interview that followed the publication of Common Ground in 1985, he had given some hints about his frame of mind, linking it with his career as a writer:

All writers are, to one extent or another, damaged people. Writing is our way of repairing ourselves. In my own case, I was filling a hole in my life which opened at the age of eight, when my mother killed herself, throwing our family into utter disarray. My father quickly developed tuberculosis – psychosomatically triggered, the doctors thought – forcing him to seek treatment in an Arizona sanatorium. We sold our house and my brother and I were shipped off to boarding school. Effectively, from the age of eight, I had no family, and certainly no community. That's one reason the book worked: I wasn't just writing a book about busing. I was filling a hole in myself.

In 1997, Lukas' book, Big Trouble: A Murder in a Small Western Town Sets Off a Struggle for the Soul of America, was undergoing final revisions. Lukas committed suicide on June 5. The suicide by hanging occurred in his apartment on the Upper West Side of Manhattan. He was survived by his wife, book editor Linda Healey.

Awards
Lukas won his first Pulitzer Prize in 1968 for "The Two Worlds of Linda Fitzpatrick" in the now-defunct award category of Local Investigative Specialized Reporting. The New York Times article documented the life of a teenager from a wealthy, Greenwich, Connecticut-based family who became involved in drugs and the hippie movement before being bludgeoned to death in the basement of an East Village tenement. Lukas was previously awarded a George Polk Award in Local Reporting in 1967 for the story.

Almost twenty years later, he received the Pulitzer Prize for General Nonfiction for Common Ground,
as well as the U.S. National Book Award for Nonfiction, the National Book Critics Award, the 1985-1986 Robert F. Kennedy Center for Justice and Human Rights Book Award and the Political Book of the Year Award.

The Lukas Prize Project, co-administered by the Columbia University's Graduate School of Journalism and the Nieman Foundation at Harvard, supports the work of American nonfiction writers. It hosts conferences and presents three annual awards: the J. Anthony Lukas Book Prize, the Mark Lynton History Prize, and the J. Anthony Lukas Work-in-Progress Award.

Selected publications
 "The Two Worlds of Linda Fitzpatrick", 1967, New York Times article on the life and death of a teenager in the 1960s counterculture — winner of the Pulitzer Prize
 The Barnyard Epithet and Other Obscenities: Notes on the Chicago Conspiracy Trial, 1970, a story on the Chicago Seven, aka the Chicago Eight
 Don't Shoot, We Are Your Children!, 1971, a collection of stories about members of the 1960s counterculture (including the Linda Fitzpatrick article). A section by Kai Erikson —sociologist and professor of American studies at Yale and editor of The Yale Review— challenged the view that there was a "generation gap" between the sixties generation and their parents generations, arguing that the sixties generation expressed overtly what previous generations had expressed covertly.
 Nightmare: The Underside of the Nixon Years, 1976, a book on Richard Nixon and the Watergate scandal, originating in two long, detailed issue-length articles on Watergate for The New York Times Sunday Magazine, and a third underway but canceled when Nixon resigned. Lukas completed work on the third article and used it as the concluding third of a massive, careful work of journalistic history.
 Common Ground: A Turbulent Decade in the Lives of Three American Families, 1985, on busing and school desegregation in Boston and three families and their histories.
 Big Trouble, 1997, a posthumously published history of a struggle between unions and mining company officials and supporters in Idaho, early in the twentieth century, after the bombing assassination of former Idaho governor Frank Steunenberg.

References

External links
  Applegate, Edd, 1996 Literary Journal: A Biographical Dictionary of Writers and Editors, Greenwood Press, Westport, Connecticut
 "A Heart, A Brain, and A Good Pair Of Shoes" (Archived), Freedman, Samuel G. Salon,  June 12, 1997
 Review by Mitgang, Herbert, 1985 New York Times, September 15, 1985, Sunday, Late City Final Edition Section 7; Page 1, Column 1; Book Review Desk
 Osen, Diane, "Interview of J. Anthony Lukas"
 Rosenbaum, Rob, 2006, "When Intellectuals Had a Real Magazine: Viva Lingua Franca!", New York News Observer, April 24, 2006
 Lerner, Kevin, “(MORE) guided journalists during the 1970s media crisis of confidence”, Columbia Journalism Review, May 10, 2018
 The State of Narrative Nonfiction Writing", Nieman Reports, The Nieman Foundation for Journalism at Harvard University, Vol. 54 No. 3 Fall 2000
 Lukas, Christopher, 2008, "Blue Genes: A Memoir of Loss and Survival", Doubleday. The autobiography of Lukas' brother.
 Blount, Roy Jr., "The Inheritance of Loss", The New York Times Book Review, September 28, 2008.

1933 births
1997 suicides
The Harvard Crimson people
American male journalists
The Baltimore Sun people
The New York Times writers
George Polk Award recipients
People from White Plains, New York
National Book Award winners
Pulitzer Prize for Investigative Reporting winners
Pulitzer Prize for General Non-Fiction winners
Suicides by hanging in New York City
American magazine editors
20th-century American non-fiction writers
The Putney School alumni
20th-century American male writers
People from the Upper West Side
1997 deaths